Lesbian, gay, bisexual, and transgender (LGBT) people in the U.S. state of Wisconsin have many of the same rights and responsibilities as heterosexuals; however, the transgender community may face some legal issues not experienced by cisgender residents, due in part to discrimination based on gender identity not being included in Wisconsin's anti-discrimination laws, nor is it covered in the state's hate crime law. Same-sex marriage has been legal in Wisconsin since October 6, 2014, when the U.S. Supreme Court refused to consider an appeal in the case of Wolf v. Walker. Discrimination based on sexual orientation is banned statewide in Wisconsin, and sexual orientation is a protected class in the state's hate crime laws. It approved such protections in 1982, making it the first state in the United States to do so.

Wisconsin is also the first state to have elected an LGBT U.S. senator, Democrat Tammy Baldwin. As of 2021, polls have found that about two-thirds of Wisconsinites support same-sex marriage.

Legality of same-sex sexual activity

Before the arrival of the Europeans, there were no known legal or social punishments for engaging in homosexual activity. Several Native American tribes recognized individuals who would act, behave and live as the opposite biological sex, nowadays also called "two-spirit". The Potawatomi refer to male-bodied individuals who act as female as m'netokwe. They are ikwekaazo (literally "men who chose to function as women") among the Ojibwe. Likewise, female-bodied individuals who act and live as male are ininiikaazo (literally "women who choose to function as men").

Wisconsin was part of the Michigan Territory in 1836, when it adopted a prohibition on sodomy that applied to both heterosexual and homosexual sexual activities, excluding cunnilingus. The criminal prohibition was retained when Wisconsin became a state in 1848. The law applied to private consensual activity as well. The definition was expanded to include fellatio in 1897 as well as the new crime of "taking improper liberties" with a minor. In the 1950s, following a series of high-profile sex crimes, Wisconsin criminalized cunnilingus and increased the penalties for "sexual perversion" to five years' imprisonment. In 1959, the state barred persons convicted of "sexual perversion" from using an automobile or any vehicle requiring a license.

In 1913, the Wisconsin Legislature passed a law providing for the possible sterilization of criminals in state institutions, including those convicted under the sodomy statute. Through the end of 1934, 645 Wisconsinites had been sterilized under the law, all of them "insane or mentally retarded". The extent of the law's application on gay men and lesbians is unknown. The statute was repealed in 1978.

In 1966, the Wisconsin Young Democrats approved a resolution urging "the abolition of all legal restriction on sexual relations between consenting adults which do not violate the rights of others", one of the first major political organizations in the United States to do so. Republican Governor Warren P. Knowles referred to supporters of the resolution as "homocrats" and some Democrats of various ages distanced themselves from the language.

In the 1970s, court challenges to the sodomy law on privacy grounds failed, but the Wisconsin Supreme Court ruled that the law should not apply to private and consensual acts between a husband and wife. In 1976, the state repealed its ban on newspapers' covering sodomy trials. In 1977, the state reclassified consensual sodomy as a misdemeanor, punishable with nine months in jail and/or a fine of 10,000 U.S. dollars.

In 1983, Wisconsin legalized private, non-commercial acts of sodomy between consenting adults. In order to obtain sufficient votes among legislators, the bill stated that Wisconsin did not approve of "any sexual conduct outside of the institution of marriage."

Recognition of same-sex relationships

Marriage

On June 6, 2014, Judge Barbara Brandriff Crabb of the United States District Court for the Western District of Wisconsin, ruling in Wolf v. Walker, struck down the state's constitutional and legislative ban on same-sex marriage as a violation of the Fourteenth Amendment of the U.S. Constitution. Her ruling was stayed until October 6, 2014, when the U.S. Supreme Court declined to hear an appeal in the case, allowing her ruling to take effect and ending Wisconsin's denial of marriage rights to same-sex couples.

Domestic partnerships

Wisconsin also had a registry of domestic partnerships that provided same-sex couples with limited rights, specifically 43 of the more than 200 spousal rights afforded to different-sex couples. The registry, Chapter 770, was established in 2009 by a provision included in the state's biennial budget bill and signed into law by Democratic Governor Jim Doyle. Wisconsin's domestic partnership registry for same-sex couples did not grant stepchild adoptions. Wisconsin was the first state in the Midwest to enact a form of recognition for same-sex unions. Out of the several states that had bans on same-sex marriage and/or civil unions, Wisconsin was the first and only one to enact limited domestic partnerships.

The registry survived a court challenge, originally Appling v. Doyle, that claimed it violated the state's constitutional amendment prohibiting the creation of a legal status "similar to that of marriage" for same-sex couples. On July 31, 2014, the Wisconsin Supreme Court ruled unanimously in the case, now known as Appling v. Walker, that the registry was constitutional, citing statements made by proponents of the constitutional amendment at issue "that the Amendment simply would not preclude a mechanism for legislative grants of certain rights to same-sex couples".

Wisconsin has provided benefits to same-sex partners of state employees since 2009. In some jurisdictions, domestic partnership benefits for state employees had been expanded beyond those rights provided to other employees under the state's domestic partnership registry. Domestic partner benefits for state employees ensures that the dependents of one partner are covered by the other partner's health insurance.

Wisconsin ended the domestic partnership registry on April 1, 2018.

Adoption and parenting
Wisconsin's domestic partner registry did not grant parental rights, but same-sex couples could obtain limited rights through a co-parenting agreement, which may not have always been enforced, or another legal arrangement granted by state courts.

Residents in Wisconsin may adopt as individuals without respect to sexual orientation. Married same-sex couples are permitted to adopt. Adoption agencies in Wisconsin will ensure that once a spouse in a same-sex relationship attains parental rights the other spouse receives comparable parental rights or full guardianship.

Additionally, lesbian couples can access in vitro fertilization (IVF) and artificial insemination treatment. State law recognizes the non-genetic, non-gestational mother as a legal parent to a child born via donor inseminmnation, but only if the parents are married.

In September 2016, a federal judge ruled that the state must record the names of both same-sex parents on the birth certificates of their children. The ruling came as a result of a lesbian couple who sued the Wisconsin Department of Health Services in 2015 after it refused to register both their names on the birth certificate of their son.

Gender-neutral birth certificate options
From July 1, 2021 birth certificates of children from same-sex couples within Wisconsin will have gender-neutral options of "spouse and spouse" or "parent 1 and parent 2".

Discrimination protections

In 1982, Wisconsin was the first state to ban discrimination based on sexual orientation in employment, housing, education, credit and all public accommodations. When Republican Governor Lee S. Dreyfus signed the law, he said that "It is a fundamental tenet of the Republican Party that government ought not intrude in the private lives of individuals where no state purpose is served, and there is nothing more private or intimate than who you live with and who you love."

There are no state-level laws against discrimination based on gender identity. However, in January 2019, Governor Tony Evers issued an executive order prohibiting discrimination on the basis of gender identity in government employment.

In addition, the counties of Dane, and Milwaukee, along with the cities of Appleton, Cudahy, De Pere, Janesville, Madison, Milwaukee, and Racine ban discrimination based on gender identity. The cities of Oshkosh and Stevens Point have policies banning discrimination against transgender city employees only.

Hate crime law
Wisconsin law punishes hate crimes based on sexual orientation, but not gender identity.

Although gender identity is not explicitly included in Wisconsin's hate crime legislation, perceived sexual orientation is often used as a medium to prosecute individuals who commit a crime based the victim's on gender identity.

Anti-bullying laws and policies
In 2001, Wisconsin legislators passed a law that prohibits discrimination based on sexual orientation in any school setting.

Any school in the state of Wisconsin that receives federal funding (regardless of being public or private) "are required by federal law to address discrimination on a number of different personal characteristics."

Gender identity and expression
Wisconsin allows a person born in the state who has completed sex reassignment surgery to amend their birth certificate once documentation of the surgery and of a change of name is provided.

Since January 2019, sex reassignment surgery has to be explicitly included within Wisconsin Medicaid programs for government employees. In May 2019, a federal judge ordered the program to be immediately extended to non-government employees as well, under the Equal Protection Clause of the 14th Amendment of the United States Constitution.

People involved in the justice system 
People in prison are entitled to hormone therapy. A 2005 Wisconsin statute denying hormone therapy to prisoners undergoing sex reassignment surgery, the Inmate Sex Change Prevention Act, was ruled unconstitutional in a unanimous opinion in the case of Fields v. Smith by a three-judge panel of United States Court of Appeals for the Seventh Circuit on August 5, 2011. The U.S. Supreme Court declined to hear the state's appeal of that decision on March 26, 2012.

People on Wisconsin's sex offender registry are not allowed to change their names. There is no exception if the person is transgender.

Sports
Although the Wisconsin Legislature passed a bill in June 2021 to legally ban transgender individuals from female sports, Olympics and/or athletics, Governor Tony Evers vetoed it.

Conversion therapy

In March 2018, Milwaukee became the first city in Wisconsin to approve a conversion therapy ban on minors. The ordinance was signed into law by Mayor Tom Barrett on April 4, and it went into effect 10 days later. In July 2018, Madison, the state capital, similarly approved a conversion therapy ban. The city of Eau Claire followed suit in October 2018.

In September 2018, the Eau Claire School Board became the first school district in Wisconsin, and in the United States, to ban school-based health center agreements with health clinics and/or providers that "endorse or engage in the practice of conversion therapy."

In January 2019, Cudahy became the fourth city in Wisconsin to legally ban conversion therapy on LGBT minors. Shorewood and Racine followed suit in June and July 2019, and Glendale, Sheboygan and Superior passed similar ordinances in August 2019.

In June 2020, the Wisconsin GOP party blocked a regulation to ban conversion therapy on minors state-wide.

In September 2020, West Allis by a vote of 6-3 passed an ordinance banning conversion therapy on minors.

In October 2020, by a vote of 14-1 Kenosha passed an ordinance that banned conversion therapy on minors. Violators can be fined a maximum of $1,000, plus the cost of courts, prosecution, assessments, among other fees and 90 days maximum in the Kenosha County Jail. The court may also suspend driving privileges for up to five years until costs are paid - a legal first for the United States to do this.

In May 2021, Sun Prairie unanimously approved a ban on conversion therapy on minors, with mayor Paul Esser expressing support for the ban, citing that his eldest son identifies as gay.

Wisconsin executive order
In June 2021 during pride month, an executive order was written and signed by the Governor of Wisconsin - to legally ban "any state taxpayers dollars within Wisconsin funding conversion therapy on LGBT minors". Various counties and cities within Wisconsin already legally ban conversion therapy by local ordinances.

GOP blocks regulations
In January 2023, the GOP blocked regulations within the Wisconsin Legislature - to legally ban conversion therapy within Wisconsin.

Public opinion
A 2017 Public Religion Research Institute (PRRI) opinion poll found that 66% of Wisconsin residents supported same-sex marriage, while 26% opposed it and 8% were unsure. Additionally, 73% supported an anti-discrimination law covering sexual orientation and gender identity. 20% were opposed.

Summary table

See also
Equality Wisconsin

References

Rights
Wisconsin
Politics of Wisconsin
Wisconsin law